The Camanachd Association Challenge Cup known as the Camanachd Cup (or less commonly the Scottish Cup) is the premier competition in the sport of shinty. It is one of the five trophies considered to be part of the Grand Slam in the sport of shinty.

The tournament 

The tournament was first played in 1896 with Kingussie beating Glasgow Cowal 2-0 at Needlefield Park, Inverness.

At present the tournament is contested by the eligible teams in North and South Division 1 (and from 2014, National Division One), together with the teams in the Premiership, who join the competition at the second round stage. There was formerly a Qualifying Cup.

Traditionally, the trophy was competed for on a North/South basis with the best team from the North facing the best team from the South only in the final.  In 1983 the open draw was introduced which resulted in the first, and until 2012, only all-South final, between Kyles and Inveraray.  1984 saw the first ever All-North final and first ever final clash between heated rivals Kingussie and Newtonmore.

Four teams have won the trophy three times in a row, Newtonmore, Kingussie, Kyles Athletic and Fort William.

The highest margin of victory was in 1997 when Kingussie hammered Newtonmore 12–1. The highest scoring final, and the previous largest margin of victory was held by Newtonmore themselves, 11–3 with Furnace in 1907.

Only Furnace (1923) and Newtonmore (2013) have gone through the competition without conceding a goal.

In 2006, the Cup had its first ever televised draw on BBC Scotland sports programme Spòrs, with the final also being broadcast live.

In 2019 the Camanachd Association named former Fort William and Scotland captain, Gary Innes as the competition's first ambassador.

The trophy 

The trophy itself was created after public donations in 1896 by Hamilton and Inches, Edinburgh. The player on the lid was modelled from Jock Dallas who played for Kingussie and whose great grandson, Ally Dallas, still plays for the same team.

In 2006, the trophy made its way to New York City for the Tartan Day celebrations, the first time it had ever left Scotland.

Celebrations of victorious teams have left the trophy in a fragile state. For example, it was left and then found in Somerled Square, Portree, after Skye Camanachd's 1990 victory, as everybody had assumed somebody else was looking after it.  So the board of directors at the Camanachd Association decided to have the trophy renovated and a replica made for presentation after finals.  The replica was to be ready for the centenary final in 2007 in Inverness but the cost was too great, and the original trophy is still being used.

The final

The final is usually played on a rotation system, with An Aird in Fort William, the Bught Park in Inverness and Mossfield Park in Oban hosting the final.  In recent years the final has also been held at The Dell in Kingussie, Dunoon and at Old Anniesland in Glasgow. The 2022 Final is set to be played at The Dell for the first time since 1999.

The 2011 final was the first ever to go to extra time; no final has ever required penalties.

The Man of the Match has been awarded the Albert Smith Medal since 1972.

Recent finals

Between the years of 1990 (when Skye defeated Newtonmore) and 2012 (When Kyles Athletic defeated Inveraray) there was not a final which did not feature either Kingussie or Fort William.

Kyles Athletic won the Cup in 1994, the match refereed by John Henderson of Caol. Captain David Taylor received the trophy from Peter Cullen of sponsor Glenmorangie Distillery Co.  Cullen died on 7 December 2011 in Edinburgh.

Oban Camanachd won the trophy in 1996, The Centennial Final, under the management of Colin MacDonald.  Ron Millican (Kiltarlity) refereed. BBC Radio Scotland provided live coverage with commentary by Iain Anderson. This was a repeat of the 1993 final.

The 2009 final was held at Mossfield Park, Oban between Kyles Athletic and holders Fort William on 19 September.  An exciting final saw Fort William take a 3–0 lead before being pegged back to 3–3 by a Kyles comeback with 10 minutes to go.  Fort William achieved a three in a row streak however thanks to a late goal by James "Big Jim" Clark and won the game 4–3.  The match was shown live on BBC 2 and BBC Alba. Ronnie Campbell refereed.

The 2010 final was played at the Bught Park on 18 September 2010 between holders Fort William and Kingussie, who have not won the trophy since 2006. Fort William won 3–2 with a goal in the last 15 seconds from Gary Innes.  Billy Wotherspoon refereed.

The 2011 final was played at the Bught yet again as An Aird is undergoing repair work. Newtonmore won the game 4–3 with an extra time goal. Derek Cameron refereed.

The 2012 final was played on 15 September at Mossfield Park, Oban.  Kyles Athletic defeated Inveraray. The match was televised on BBC Two with commentary from Gary Innes.

In 2013, Newtonmore lifted the trophy for the 30th time without conceding a goal the whole tournament.

The 2014 Camanachd Cup Final saw Kingussie win it for the 23rd time. This win also marked 100 years since Kingussie won 6–1 against Kyles at Possil Park in Glasgow. Four months after this final Britain declared war on Germany. By the end of 1918, six players of the winning team were dead, two had been shot and wounded, and one had been badly gassed. To commemorate this, the 2014 winning team wore specially-made shirts which included a remembrance poppy and the names of the 1914 players, including those who gave their lives.

In the 2015 final Lovats Goalkeeper Stuart MacDonald was the winner of the Albert smith medal as his side went on to win 2–1.

The 2016 final saw Oban return to the show-piece occasion but in an uneventful game, Newtonmore reclaimed the trophy for their 31st win.

The 2017 final saw both 2015 and 2016 Camanachd Cup champions face off with Newtonmore retaining the title against a spirited Lovat side.

The 2019 final was postponed due to a waterlogged pitch. It was called off at the start of the second half.

In 2021 Kinlochshiel defeated Lovat 3–1 in the Final held at Mossfield Park in Oban. A hat-trick from captain Keith MacRae ensured the Camanachd Cup would reside in Wester Ross for the first time in its 125-year history.

In 2022, the final was held in Kingussie (having been scheduled for play there in 2020, but being cancelled due to the COVID-19 pandemic). It was a win for Kingussie the home-side, winning 3-1 v Lovat.

Media coverage 
The Camanachd Cup final is shown live on BBC Two Scotland.

Sponsorship

Glenmorangie and SSE plc have both sponsored the Camanachd Cup. In 2017 the cup was first sponsored by Tulloch Home.

Winners 

1896 - Kingussie 2, Glasgow Cowal 0, at Inverness

1897 - Beauly  5, Brae Lochaber 0, at Inverness

1898 - Beauly 2, Inverary 1, at Inverness

1899 - Ballachulish  2, Kingussie 1, at Perth

1900 - Kingussie 1 - 0 Furnace at Inverness; Replay played in Perth *Final drawn in Inverness, replayed in Perth

1901 - Ballachulish 2, Kingussie 1, at Inverness

1902 - Kingussie 3, Ballachulish 1, at Inverness

1903 -  Kingussie awarded Cup after final drawn in Perth, with Inverary  refusing to play replay in Inverness

1904 - Kyles Athletic 4, Laggan 1, at Kingussie

1905 - Kyles Athletic 2, Newtonmore 0, at Inverness

1906 - Kyles Athletic 4, Newtonmore 2, at Inverness

1907 - Newtonmore 7, Kyles Athletic 2,  at Kingussie

1908 - Newtonmore 5, Furnace 2,  at Inverness

1909 - Newtonmore 11, Furnace 3, at Glasgow

1910 - Newtonmore 6, Furnace 1, at Kingussie

1911  - Ballachulish 3, Newtonmore 1,  at Lochaber (Newtonmore had won 3-2, but a protest was granted to Ballachulish - Original final played in Inverness)

1912 - Ballachulish 4, Newtonmore 2, at Perth

1913 - Beauly 3, Kyles Athletic 1, at Kingussie

1914 - Kingussie 6, Kyles Athletic 1, at Glasgow

1915-19 -  No competition owing to Great War

1920 - Kyles Athletic 2, Kingussie 1, at Glasgow, after drawn game, 0-0 at Inverness

1921 - Kingussie 2, Kyles Athletic I, at Inverness)

1922 - Kyles Athletic 6, Beauly 3, at Oban

1923 - Furnace 2, Newtonmore 0, at Inverness

1924 - Kyles Athletic 2, Newtonmore 1, at Kingussie, after drawn game, 3-3, at Glasgow

1925 - Inverary  2, Lovat  0, at Inverness)

1926 - Inverary 3, Spean Bridge 2, at Oban

1927 - Kyles Athletic 2, Newtonmore 1, at Inverness)

1928 - Kyles Athletic 6, Boleskine 2, at Glasgow

1929 - Newtonmore 5, Kyles Athletic  3, at Spean Bridge

1930 - Inverary  2, Caberfeidh 1, at Oban

1931 -   Newtonmore 4, Inverary 1, at Inverness

1932 -   Newtonmore 1, Oban 0, at Glasgow

1933 - Oban Camanachd 3, Newtonmore 2, at Keppoch, Lochaber, after drawn game, 1-1, at Corpach, Fort William

1934 - Caberfeidh 3, Kyles Athletic  0, at Inveraray

1935 - Kyles Athletic  6, Caberfeidh 4, at Inverness

1936 - Newtonmore 1, Kyles Athletic  0. at Spean Bridge, after drawn game, 2-2, at Inverness

1937 - Oban Celtic 2. Newtonmore 1, at Keppoch, after drawn game, 2-2 at Inverness

1938 - Oban Camanachd 4, Inverness 2. at Oban

1939 - Caberfeidh 2, Kyles Athletic 1, at Inverness

1940-46  - No competition owing to Second World War

1947 - Newtonmore 4, Lochfyneside 0, at Oban

1948 - Newtonmore 4, Ballachulish 2, at Inverness

1949 - Oban Celtic 1, Newtonmore 0, at Glasgow

1950  - Newtonmore 4. Lochfyneside 2, at Oban

1951 - Newtonmore 8, Oban Camanachd  2, at Inverness

1952 - Inverness  3, Oban Celtic 2. at Glasgow

1953 - Lovat 4, Kyles Athletic  1, at Fort William,  after drawn game. 2-2, at Oban

1954 - Oban Celtic 4. Newtonmore 1, at Inverness

1955  - Newtonmore 5, Kyles Athletic  2, at Glasgow

1956 - Kyles Athletic 4, Kilmallie 1, at Oban

1957  - Newtonmore 3, Kyles Athletic  1, at Spean Bridge

1958 - Newtonmore 3, Oban Camanachd 1, at Inverness

1959  - Newtonmore 7, Kyles Athletic  3, at Glasgow

1960  - Oban Celtic 4. Newtonmore 1, at Oban

1961  - Kingussie 2. Oban Celtic 1, at Fort William

1962 - Kyles Athletic  3, Kilmallie 1, (Final played in Inverness)

1963 - Oban Celtic 3, Kingussie 2, at Glasgow

1964 - Kilmallie 4. Inverary  1, at Fort William

1965  - Kyles Athletic  4, Kilmallie 1, at Oban

1966  - Kyles Athletic  3. Newtonmore 2, at Inverness

1967 - Newtonmore 3, Inverary  0, at Glasgow

1968 - Kyles Athletic  2, Kingussie 1, at Oban, after drawn game, 3-3, at Fort William

1969 - Kyles Athletic  3, Kilmallie 1, at Oban

1970 - Newtonmore 7, Kyles Athletic  1, at Kingussie

1971 - Newtonmore 7, Kyles Athletic  1, at Inverness

1972 - Newtonmore 6, Oban Celtic 3 at Glasgow

1973  - Glasgow Mid Argyll 4, Kingussie 2, at Fort William

1974 - Kyles Athletic  4, Kingussie 1, at Oban

1975 - Newtonmore 1, Kyles Athletic 0, at Fort William, after drawn game, 3-3, at Kingussie

1976 - Kyles Athletic  4, Newtonmore 2, at Inverness

1977 - Newtonmore 5, Kyles Athletic 3, at Glasgow

1978 - Newtonmore 3, Kyles Athletic  2, at Fort William

1979 - Newtonmore 4, Kyles Athletic  3, at Oban

1980 - Kyles Athletic  6, Newtonmore 5, at Kingussie

1981 - Newtonmore 4, Oban Camanachd  1, at Glasgow

1982  - Newtonmore 8, Oban Celtic 2, at Inverness

1983 - Kyles Athletic  3, Strachur and District 2, at Fort William

1984 - Kingussie 4, Newtonmore 1, at Oban

1985 - Newtonmore 4, Kingussie 2, at Kingussie

1986 - Newtonmore 5, Oban Camanachd  1, at Glasgow

1987 - Kingussie 4, Newtonmore 3, at Fort William

1988 - Kingussie 4, Glenurquhart 2, at Inverness)

1989  - Kingussie 5, Newtonmore 1, at Oban

1990 - Skye  4, Newtonmore 1, at Fort William

1991 - Kingussie 3, Fort William 1, at Inverness

1992  - Fort William 1, Kingussie 0, at Glasgow

1993 - Kingussie 4, Oban Camanachd  0, at Fort William

1994 - Kyles Athletic  3, Fort William 1, at Inverness

1995 - Kingussie 3, Oban Camanachd  2, at Oban

1996 - Oban Camanachd 3, Kingussie 2, at Inverness

1997 - Kingussie 12, Newtonmore 1, at Fort William

1998 - Kingussie 7, Oban Camanachd 3, at Oban

1999 - Kingussie 3, Oban Camanachd  0, at Kingussie

2000 - Kingussie 3, Kyles Athletic  1, at Fort William

2001 - Kingussie 2, Oban Camanachd  0, at Glasgow

2002 - Kingussie 3, Inverary 2, at Inverness

2003  - Kingussie 6, Fort William 0, at Fort William

2004  - Inverary  1, Fort William 0, at Oban

2005 - Fort William 3, Kilmallie 2, at Fort William

2006 - Kingussie 4, Fort William 2, at Dunoon

2007 - Fort William 3, Inveraray 1, at Inverness

2008 - Fort William 2, Kingussie 1, at Fort William

2009 - Fort William 4, Kyles Athletic  3, at Oban

2010 - Fort William 3, Kingussie 2, at Inverness

2011 - Newtonmore 4, Kingussie 3, at Inverness, (A.E.T.)

2012 - Kyles Athletic 6, Inverary 5, at Oban

2013 - Newtonmore 3, Kyles Athletic 0, at Fort William

2014 - Kingussie 4, Glenurquhart 0, at Inverness

2015 - Lovat 2, Kyles Athletic 1, at Oban

2016 - Newtonmore 1, Oban Camanachd 0, at Fort William

2017 - Newtonmore 3, Lovat 2, at Bught Park, Inverness

2018 - Newtonmore 3, Lovat 0, at Oban

2019 - Newtonmore 5, Oban Camanachd 1, at Fort William (after first game was abandoned at 0-0)

2020 - Cancelled due to the COVID 19 Pandemic

2021 - Kinlochshiel 3, Lovat 1, at Oban

2022 - Kingussie 3, Lovat 1, at Kingussie

Total titles won

Runners-up by club

See also
David Borthwick,  the most decorated player in the history of the shinty, having won 15 Camanachd Cup winner's medals

References

External links 
Latest fixtures

Shinty competitions
1896 establishments in Scotland